Camp Gesher is a Jewish summer camp near Cloyne, Ontario. It is a member of the Habonim Dror Zionist youth movement and the Ontario Camping Association.

 
Camp Gesher originated in 1963 as a member of the Dror Hachalutz Hatzair Zionist Youth Organization, a merger of Camp Revivim (serving campers from Ottawa and Toronto) and Camp Kissufim (serving campers from Montreal). Gesher was the first camp to test the merging of the Habonim and Dror Youth Movements in 1975.

Literary references 
The Program, a novel by Hal Niedzviecki, takes place in part at Camp Gesher.

External links

References

Gesher
Gesher
Buildings and structures in Lennox and Addington County
Jewish socialism
Secular Jewish culture in Canada